Barr Beacon Reservoir is a covered, hill-top drinking water reservoir at Barr Beacon, Walsall, England, opened in 1899. It is operated by South Staffs Water.

One of the uses of the reservoir is to transfer water from the company's works at Hampton Loade, on the River Severn, to Burton upon Trent. Water is pumped uphill from the Sedgley Beacon Reservoirs, which receive water from Hampton Loade, through  mains to Barr Beacon Reservoir via West Bromwich Booster. A  main then carries water by gravity via Seedy Mill works to Burton on Trent.

The water company also operates a weather station, one of several in its network, at the reservoir, to monitor temperature, hours of sunshine, and rainfall.

The reservoir was re-roofed in 1969, temporarily exposing the brick arches which support the roof.

In August 2013, Severn Trent Water launched a £2 million project to build a 2 1/2 mile pipeline linking their Perry Barr Reservoir to Barr Beacon Reservoir, to allow for the exchange of water in emergencies such as severe droughts.

2011 flooding incident 

Dozens of families had to be evacuated. Eleven fire trucks, from stations as far away as Erdington, and a high-volume pump from Sheldon, attended. A fire service boat was also deployed. The West Midlands Police, police helicopter, ambulance service and a specialist Automobile Association vehicle recovery unit also attended. Waters did not subside until 8am. The cause of the burst was not known, but South Staffs Water estimated that the floods caused more than a £1 million of damage.

References

External links 
 Image of the inside of the reservoir

Drinking water reservoirs in England
Buildings and structures in the West Midlands (county)
Buildings and structures in Walsall
Reservoirs in the West Midlands (county)